Crazy Enough is an album by Portland rock singer Storm Large. It contains all the songs performed in the eponymous theater piece written and played by Large.

Track listing

Personnel 

 Storm Large: Vocals, producer
 James Beaton: Piano, guitars, keyboards, producer
 Jim Brunberg: Guitars, bass, backing vocals, engineer, mixing, producer
 David Loprinzi: Bass, guitars
 Greg Eklund: Drums
 Keiko Araki: Violin
 Adam Hoornstra: Viola, string arrangements
 Shelby Smith: Assistant engineer
 Jonathan Newsome: Assistant engineer
 John "Lou" Lousteau: Engineer
 Dave McNair: Mastering
 Laura Domela: Photography
 Queenby Moone: Graphic design

References

External links

2009 albums
Storm Large albums